Finndalshorungen is a mountain in Lom Municipality in Innlandet county, Norway. The mountain is surrounded by several other notable mountains including Horrungen to the west; Leirungshøi to the north; Ryggehøi, Skardtind, Rundkollan, and Storbrettingskollen to the northeast; and Gjerdinghøi and Lauvknubben to the east.

See also
List of mountains of Norway

References

Lom, Norway
Mountains of Innlandet